Mbhazima Samuel (Sam) Shilowa, correct Tsonga spelling "Xilowa" (born 30 April 1958) is a South African politician. A former Premier of Gauteng province while a member of the African National Congress, Shilowa left the party to help form the opposition Congress of the People, with whom he was briefly the Deputy President. In the 2009 general election, Shilowa was elected to parliament with COPE.

Early life
Shilowa was born at Olifantshoek in what is now called the Limpopo Province and completed his secondary education at Akani High School in 1978. The following year he moved to Johannesburg to seek employment and started working at John Weinberg Hardware in Germiston. He then moved to Anglo Alpha Cement in Roodepoort and later joined PSG Services in Johannesburg.

Trade Unions
In 1981, Shilowa joined the trade union movement and became a shop steward fighting for better working conditions and defending the rights of his fellow workers. He was elected Vice-President and later President of the South African Transport and Allied Workers Union.

Shilowa played a prominent role in the formation of the Congress of South African Trade Unions (COSATU) in 1985 and was elected Deputy Chairperson of COSATU’s Gauteng region. In 1991, he was elected Deputy General Secretary of COSATU and in 1993 became the General Secretary. Shilowa then played a huge role in the forming of the National Economic Development and Labour Council (NEDLAC) which established close co-operation between government, organized labour and business. He was part of the African National Congress' negotiating team at the Convention for a Democratic South Africa (CODESA) negotiations in 1992 which led to the writing of South Africa’s democratic constitution.

In 1997, Shilowa became a member of the African National Congress and on 15 June 1999 he was elected Premier of Gauteng Province and had to give up his post as General Secretary of COSATU.

Resignation
On 29 September 2008, soon after the South African President Thabo Mbeki was forced out of office, Mbhazima handed in his resignation as premier. He was succeeded by Paul Mashatile. Shilowa later resigned from the ANC and announced his support for Mosiuoa Lekota's movement for a national congress.

Deputy President of COPE 
On 16 December, 2008, Shilowa was elected Deputy President of the Congress of the People by a landslide vote.  His election as First Deputy President entails that he is Executive Deputy President, alongside former businesswomen Lynda Odendaal, who carries the title of Second Deputy President, which means that she is the more ceremonial deputy.

On 22 April, 2009, the day of the 2009 general elections, Shilowa duly voted for his new party, declaring to friends on his Facebook page:

I voted for the future I desire and for a party that I believe will take forward my aspirations.  I voted for change, a party of HOPE for today and tomorrow.  I voted for the government of the people.  I voted COPE [....]

Earlier he had written:

Today I cast my vote for a party born out of our new democracy and constitution - Cope. I stood on the quee  for an hour to vote.  I used the time to talk to ordinary men and women about everything from Cope, the weather, religion etc.  Go out and vote for hope and change.  Do not forget to get your family, friends and neighbours to go and vote for Cope.

Expulsion
Lekota expelled Shilowa from the party after an internal hearing found him guilty of mismanaging parliamentary funds. He was found guilty of wrongfully authorising the transfer of R5m from the parliamentary allowance accounts to Cope's party accounts, and authorising a payment of more than R2m for purposes that were not legitimate.

Shilowa has denied the charges and is challenging his expulsion in court.

Personal life
He belongs to the Tsonga tribe and the appropriate spelling of his surname is "Xilowa". 
He has two children.

References

1958 births
Living people
African National Congress politicians
Congress of the People (South African political party) politicians
Members of the National Assembly of South Africa
People from Makhado Local Municipality
Premiers of Gauteng
Tsonga people